Dichoptera is a genus of planthoppers found in tropical Asia. They were formerly placed in the family Dictyopharidae but are now considered members of the family Fulgoridae.

They have large and stout bodies with long membranous forewings. The head is short and may have a long process. There are 11 species in the genus.

Often found on the bark of Ficus trees, they are tended by ants and sometimes parasitized by Dryinidae.

References

Fulgoridae
Auchenorrhyncha genera